Pachynectes is a genus of beetles in the family Dytiscidae, containing the following species:

 Pachynectes costulifer (Régimbart, 1903)
 Pachynectes hygrotoides (Régimbart, 1895)
 Pachynectes mendax Guignot, 1960

References

Dytiscidae